Maro Balić (born 5 June 1971, in Dubrovnik) is a retired water polo player from Croatia, who was a member of the national team that won the silver medal at the 1996 Summer Olympics in Atlanta, Georgia.

See also
 Croatia men's Olympic water polo team records and statistics
 List of Olympic medalists in water polo (men)
 List of men's Olympic water polo tournament goalkeepers

References

External links
 

1971 births
Living people
Sportspeople from Dubrovnik
Croatian male water polo players
Water polo goalkeepers
Olympic silver medalists for Croatia in water polo
Water polo players at the 1996 Summer Olympics
Medalists at the 1996 Summer Olympics